The Thailand women's national under-18 volleyball team represents Thailand in women's under-18 volleyball events, it is controlled and managed by the Thailand Volleyball Association (TVA) that is a member of Asian volleyball body Asian Volleyball Confederation (AVC) and the international volleyball body government the Fédération Internationale de Volleyball (FIVB).

Team

Coaching staff

Current squad
The following 18 players were called up for the 2018 Asian Girls' U17 Volleyball Championship in Nakhon Pathom, Thailand.

Statistics
Updated after 2018 Asian Championship

Record against selected opponents
Record against opponents in Asian Championships and World Championships (as of 27 May 2018):

  1–0
  1–0
  7–0
  0–1
  0–1
  2–8
  0–1
  0–1
  0–1
  1–1
  0–1
  4–0
  1–2
  5–0
  5–0
  1–0
  1–4
  0–8
  3–0
  2–1
  4–9
  3–0
  1–0
  1–0
  1–0
  1–0
  0–1
  6–0
  2–3
  0–1
  0–3
  1–0
  2–0
  1–0
  0–1
  8–4
  0–1
  1–0
  0–1
  2–0

Competition history

Youth Olympic Games
 Champions   Runners-up   Third place   Fourth place

World Championship
 Champions   Runners-up   Third place   Fourth place

Asian Championship
 Champions   Runners-up   Third place   Fourth place

See also
 Thailand women's national volleyball team
 Thailand women's national under-23 volleyball team
 Thailand women's national under-20 volleyball team

External links
Official website
FIVB profile

U
Women's volleyball in Thailand
National women's under-18 volleyball teams